Gallery or The Gallery may refer to:

Arts, entertainment, and media

 Art gallery
 Contemporary art gallery

Music
 Gallery (band), an American soft rock band of the 1970s

Albums
 Gallery (Elaiza album), 2014 album
 Gallery (Great White album), a 1999 compilation album
 Gallery, an album by Bert Kaempfert 1974
 The Gallery (album), a 1995 album by Dark Tranquility
 Gallery, 2017 album by Arizona

Songs
 "Gallery" (Mario Vazquez song)
 Gallery (Yōko Oginome song)
 "Gallery", a 2018 track by Toby Fox from Deltarune Chapter 1 OST from the video game Deltarune
 "The Gallery", a song on the Joni Mitchell album Clouds
 "The Gallery", a song on the Bradley Joseph album Rapture
 In the Gallery, a song on the initial and self-titled Dire Straits album

Television
 Gallery (TV series), Canadian documentary series on CBC Television (1973–1979)
 Gallery Girls, a reality TV program

Other arts, entertainment, and media
 Gallery (magazine), published by Montcalm Publishing
 Gallery Project, an open-source project enabling management and web publication of photographs and other media
 The Gallery (video game), a virtual reality game series
 The Gallery, a 1947 novel by John Horne Burns

Buildings and spaces
 Gallery, a horizontal passage in an underground mine
 Gallery, a production control room, in a UK television studio
 Art gallery or art museum, an exhibition in a museum or other public space, or a retail art shop
 Gallery (architecture)
 An exterior balcony
 Observation deck, usually on the upper floors of a building, used to afford visitors a long-distance view
 Veranda, an open-air gallery or porch

People
 Daniel V. Gallery (1901–1977), Rear Admiral in the U.S. Navy during World War II; fought in the Battle of the Atlantic
 Mary Onahan Gallery (1866–1941), American writer, editor
 Philip D. Gallery (1907–1973), Rear Admiral who served on Naval destroyers in the Pacific Theater
 Robert Gallery (born 1980), American football player
 William O. Gallery (1904–1981), Rear Admiral, naval aviator

Places
 Gallery Hotel, a hotel in Singapore
 Gallery Place station, a metro station in Washington, DC, US
 The Gallery (disco), a 1970s disco in New York City, US
 The Gallery at Market East, former name of the Fashion District, Philadelphia, a shopping mall in Philadelphia, US

Other uses
 Gallery, an audience or a group of spectators
 Peanut gallery, a nickname for spectators occupying the cheapest seats
 Gallery forest, a forest formed along a waterway
 Gallery grave, a type of prehistoric megalithic tomb
 Gallery road, a mountain road in China
 Oil gallery, a lubricating-oil passage within an internal combustion engine

See also

 
 
 Galleria (disambiguation)
 Shooting gallery (disambiguation)
 The Galleries (disambiguation)